Lisdoonvarna/Kilshanny parish is a parish in County Clare and part of the Kilfenora Deanery of the Roman Catholic Diocese of Galway, Kilmacduagh and Kilfenora. The parishes Lisdoonvarna and Kilshanny amalgamated in the 1980s.

Current (2021) parish priest is Robert McNamara.

The parish is an amalgamation of the mediaeval parishes of Kilmoon, Killeany, Killilagh and Owghtory.

The main church of the parish is the Church of Corpus Christi in Lisdoonvarna, built in 1868. The second church of the parish is the Church of St. Augustine in Kilshanny. This church was blessed in  1894 by bishop Francis McCormack. This is a descendant of the earlier abbey by the Canons Regular of St. Augustine founded in 1189. Third church is the Church of our Lady of Lourdes in Toovaghera. This church is built in 1878. The coastal village Doolin has a church built in 1821 named the Church of the Holy Rosary.

References

Parishes of the Roman Catholic Diocese of Galway, Kilmacduagh and Kilfenora